The name Chanthu has been used to name four tropical cyclones in the western north Pacific. The name was submitted by Cambodia and means flower.
 Severe Tropical Storm Chanthu (2004) (T0405, 08W, Gener) – struck Vietnam
 Typhoon Chanthu (2010) (T1003, 04W, Caloy) – struck China
 Severe Tropical Storm Chanthu (2016) (T1607, 09W) – brushed the eastern coast of Japan at peak intensity
 Typhoon Chanthu (2021) (T2114, 19W, Kiko) – A Category 5 super typhoon that caused damage mainly in Taiwan, China, and Japan.

Pacific typhoon set index articles